Rose Hollermann (born December 25, 1995) is an American  3.5 point wheelchair basketball player who won gold at the 2011 Women's U25 Wheelchair Basketball World Championship in St. Catharines, Canada, the 2011 Parapan American Games in Guadalajara, Mexico, the 2015 Parapan American Games in Toronto, Canada, the 2016 Paralympics in Rio de Janeiro, Brazil, and the 2019 Women's U25 Wheelchair Basketball World Championship in Suphanburi, Thailand.

Biography
Rose Hollermann was born in Mankato, Minnesota, on December 25, 1995, the daughter of John and Michelle Hollermann. She had three brothers: Shane, Ethan, and Seth.

On August 10, 2001, Rose, her mother and three brothers were in a motor vehicle accident outside their home in Elysian, Minnesota. Her two older brothers Ethan and Shane were killed. She had bruising to her spinal cord around the T11 and T12 thoracic vertebrae, leaving her partly paralyzed from the waist down. She can stand, and walk a little, but spends much of her time in a wheelchair.

After the accident, she was sent to the Courage Center in Minnesota, where swimming was part of her therapy. Soon she was swimming competitively. She also took to sled hockey, archery, tennis, cross-country skiing, and track and field sports, including discus, shot put, and distance races while  at Waterville-Elysian-Morristown High School. Then she discovered wheelchair basketball, playing with the Courage Center Rolling Timberwolves. In this sport, in which she is classified a 3.5 point player, she was a National Junior champion in 2008, 2009 and 2010. She won a gold medal in 2010 at the U20 World Championship, and then another at the 2011 Women's U25 Wheelchair Basketball World Championship in St. Catharines, Canada.

In 2011, Hollermann became the youngest person to ever make the national team, and won a gold medal at the 2011 Parapan American Games in Guadalajara, Mexico. The following year she made her Paralympic debut at the 2012 London Paralympics. In 2014 the University of Texas at Arlington (UTA) awarded her a full athletic scholarship to play on its new Lady Movin' Mavs wheelchair basketball team. She won gold again at the 2015 Parapan American Games in Toronto, Canada.
The Lady Movin' Mavs won their first national title in 2016, defeating the top-seeded University of Illinois team 65–51 in the National Wheelchair Basketball Association intercollegiate tournament in Edinboro, Pennsylvania. Hollermann, who contributed 35 points, nine rebounds and seven assists, was named the 2015–16 NWBA Collegiate Player of the Year. In 2016, still the youngest player on the USA team, she won gold at the 2016 Rio Paralympics.

Hollermann continued to play with the Movin' Mavs. On March 17, 2018, they capped off an undefeated season by beating their arch-rivals, the University of Alabama 65–55 to win the national championship. In 2018, she was one of three UTA students selected for the national team at the 2018 Wheelchair Basketball World Championship in Hamburg, Germany, where Team USA came sixth.

On March 16, 2019, the Movin' Mavs once again faced the University of Alabama in the national championship final, but this time fell short, losing 82–76 in extra time. In May 2019 she won a gold medal with the U25 Women's side at the 2019 Women's U25 Wheelchair Basketball World Championship in  Suphanburi, Thailand. Team USA defeated Australia in the final 62–25. She was selected as one of the All-Star Five, along with her Movin' Mav teammates Abby Dunkin and Annabelle Lindsay.

References

External links
 
 

1995 births
Living people
American women's wheelchair basketball players
Basketball players from Minnesota
Paralympic wheelchair basketball players of the United States
Paralympic gold medalists for the United States
Paralympic medalists in wheelchair basketball
Paralympic bronze medalists for the United States
Wheelchair basketball players at the 2016 Summer Paralympics
Wheelchair basketball players at the 2020 Summer Paralympics
Medalists at the 2016 Summer Paralympics
Medalists at the 2020 Summer Paralympics
Sportspeople from Mankato, Minnesota
UT Arlington Mavericks women's wheelchair basketball players
21st-century American women
20th-century American women